The Indian Hockey Federation was the administrative body of field hockey in India. Incorporated in 1925, it was under the global jurisdiction of the International Hockey Federation.

Background

It was the apex governing body of field hockey in India. It was formed on 7 November 1925 in Gwalior. It was the first non-European team to be a part of the FIH. As a member of the International Hockey Federation, it represented India in all international matches under the former leadership of KPS Gill  & the secretary of the federation, K.Jyothikumaran. The women's team was directed by the Indian Women's Hockey Federation.

Prem Nath Sahni an Indian Administrative Service officer with interest in hockey since his college days took over stewardship of the Indian Hockey Federation in 1973 at a time when conflicts broke out between its Northern and Southern wings. The Indian Hockey scene was marked by excellence until 1973 when Ashwani Kumar the then president stepped down followed by a spell of chaos in the organization. There was a conflict between the North and South blocs of the federation. P.N. Sahni belonged to the North bloc and that was the heartland of hockey in India. But one M. A. M. Ramaswamy, a rich millionaire from the southern block struggled to capture the presidency and succeeded because of support form the southern lobby in the Union government. It seems that this feud and the passing of control of Indian hockey to the southern wing led to the downfall of hockey standards in India. It lost its supremacy in the game on the world stage ever since.  P N Sahni remained the President of the Haryana Olympic Association from 1969 to 1978

Suspension
Kandaswamy Jothikumaran of the IOA resigned after a television show accused the federation's secretary of corruption in April 2008.  K P S Gill, IHF chief for 14 years, lost his position  when the Indian Hockey Federation was suspended by the Indian Olympic Association (IOA) on 28 April.

Dissolution
The Indian Olympic Association appointed a new five-member national selection committee. This panel will work in conjunction with the International Field Hockey Federation.  The panel is headed by Narala Saikiran, a former MP and former hockey captain and includes Ashok Kumar, Ajit Pal Singh, Zafar Iqbal, and Dhanraj Pillay. , 

Hockey India is the new governing body of field hockey in India. It was formed after Indian Hockey Federation was dismissed in 2008 by IOA. In a significant way forward, Indian Hockey Federation (I.H.F) & Hockey India (H.I) on 25 July 2011 signed an agreement leading up to formation of a joint executive board which shall perform the function of the National Sports Federation for field hockey.

IHF was disbanded in 2014, following the Indian Government's recognition of Hockey India as the sole body responsible towards governing field hockey in India.

See also
Hockey India
India men's national field hockey team
India women's national field hockey team

References

External links
" Indian hockey body is suspended" - BBC
 "We’ll make a Chak De type team: Aslam" - Express India

Field hockey in India
Sports governing bodies in India
1928 establishments in India
Sports organizations established in 1928
Sports organizations disestablished in 2014
2014 disestablishments in India